The Central District of Nain County is a district (bakhsh) in Nain County, Isfahan Province, Iran. At the 2006 census, its population was 33,906, in 10,025 families.  The District has two cities: Nain & Bafran. The District has four rural districts (dehestan): Bafran Rural District, Baharestan Rural District, Kuhestan Rural District, and Lay Siyah Rural District.

References 

Nain County
Districts of Isfahan Province